Equality of Treatment (Social Security) Convention, 1962 is  an International Labour Organization Convention.

It was established in 1962, with the preamble stating:
Having decided upon the adoption of certain proposals with regard to equality of treatment of nationals and non-nationals in social security,...

Ratifications
As of 2013, the treaty has been ratified by 38 states. One of these ratifying states—the Netherlands (for the Kingdom in Europe only)—has denounced the treaty.

External links 
Text.
Ratifications.

Anti-discrimination treaties
International Labour Organization conventions
Treaties concluded in 1962
Treaties entered into force in 1964
Social security
Treaties of Bangladesh
Treaties of Barbados
Treaties of Bolivia
Treaties of the military dictatorship in Brazil
Treaties of Cape Verde
Treaties of the Central African Republic
Treaties of the Democratic Republic of the Congo (1964–1971)
Treaties of Denmark
Treaties of Ecuador
Treaties of Egypt
Treaties of Finland
Treaties of France
Treaties of West Germany
Treaties of Guatemala
Treaties of Guinea
Treaties of India
Treaties of Ba'athist Iraq
Treaties of Ireland
Treaties of Israel
Treaties of Italy
Treaties of Jordan
Treaties of Kenya
Treaties of the Libyan Arab Republic
Treaties of Madagascar
Treaties of Mauritania
Treaties of Mexico
Treaties of Norway
Treaties of Pakistan
Treaties of the Philippines
Treaties of Rwanda
Treaties of Suriname
Treaties of Sweden
Treaties of Syria
Treaties of Tunisia
Treaties of Turkey
Treaties of Uruguay
Treaties of Venezuela
Treaties extended to Aruba
Treaties extended to the Netherlands Antilles
Treaties extended to Surinam (Dutch colony)
Treaties extended to the Faroe Islands
Treaties extended to Greenland
1962 in labor relations